Mariamma Chedathy, also known as Mariamma John, was a folklorist from the state of Kerala in India. Mariamma Chedathy died on 31 August 2008.

Sources
 B. C. Folklore, Bulletin of the British Columbia Folklore Society, has published three articles based on the book Manikkam Pennu
The Death and Resurrection of Kamachavelan, B. C. Folklore, No. 11
Manikkam Pennu: a Paraya Folktale, No. 12
Humans, Gods, and Nature in Paraya Folklore, No. 14

References

Year of birth missing
2008 deaths
Malayali people
Indian folklorists
Women from Kerala
20th-century Indian women
20th-century Indian people